Christopher O'Connell was the defending champion but chose not to defend his title.

Michael Mmoh won the title after defeating Gabriel Diallo 6–3, 6–2 in the final.

Seeds

Draw

Finals

Top half

Bottom half

References

External links
Main draw
Qualifying draw

Fairfield Challenger - 1
2022 Singles